Self and Identity is a quarterly peer-reviewed psychology journal covering the psychology of self. It was established in 2002 and is published by Taylor & Francis on behalf of the International Society for Self and Identity, of which it is the official journal. The editor-in-chief is Shira Gabriel (University of Buffalo). According to the Journal Citation Reports, the journal has a 2016 impact factor of 1.463.

References

External links

Psychology journals
Taylor & Francis academic journals